Tanque Novo is a municipality in Bahia, Northeast Region, Brazil.

See also
 List of municipalities in Bahia

References

Municipalities in Bahia